Martha Mason (May 31, 1937 – May 4, 2009) was a writer born and based in Lattimore, North Carolina who spent 61 years in an iron lung.

Early life
Afflicted with polio at age eleven during the epidemic of 1948, Mason was sent home from the hospital in an iron lung, in which she remained for the rest of her life. She preferred the iron lung to newer ventilators as it did not require intubation, surgery, or hospitalization. Her brother, Gaston Mason, died of polio and it was only a few days after his funeral that her own polio symptoms began.

She completed high school with daily visits from her teachers, and graduated first in her class with highest honors.

Mason moved to Boiling Springs with her parents to enroll in Gardner-Webb College (now University), earning an associate degree at age 21. She then attended (again with her parents' accompaniment) Wake Forest College (also now University), earning a bachelor's degree in English in 1960. She was first in her classes at both colleges. She received an honorary doctorate from Gardner-Webb University in May 2004.

After her education, Mason returned to Lattimore and started work at a local newspaper; her mother took dictation of her work. Shortly after, her father was incapacitated by a heart attack and her mother was unable to assist her in her work.

Later life
Mason returned to writing in the mid 1990s when advancements in speech recognition technology enabled her to operate a computer on her own, giving her the ability to dictate and edit, as well as to browse the Internet.

This latter factor was particularly significant for Mason. While her highly social and independent lifestyle (she hosted dinner parties and managed her own household, for example) would probably have only been possible in a tight-knit community (Lattimore's current population is approximately 400), her broad interests were not in tune with small-town perspectives.

She wrote a memoir, Breath: Life in the Rhythm of an Iron Lung, which was published in 2003. She was also the subject of Martha in Lattimore (2005), a documentary film by Mary Dalton. Mason also appeared in the Oscar-nominated documentary about polio The Final Inch (2009).

Death
She died in Lattimore shortly after dawn on Monday, May 4, 2009, one month shy of her 72nd birthday. She had lived 61 years in an iron lung before her death, longer than any other polio survivor in the world.

References

External links

1937 births
2009 deaths
People with polio
People from Cleveland County, North Carolina
20th-century American memoirists
American women memoirists
Writers from North Carolina
Gardner–Webb University alumni
Wake Forest University alumni
21st-century American women writers
21st-century American non-fiction writers
20th-century American women writers